Sidek is a surname. Notable people with the surname include: 

Jalani Sidek (born 1963), Malaysian badminton player and coach
Khadijah Sidek (1918–1982), Malay nationalist and politician
Misbun Sidek (born 1960), Malaysian badminton player
Rahman Sidek (born 1968), Malaysian badminton player and coach
Rashid Sidek (born 1968), Malaysian badminton player and coach
Razif Sidek (born 1962), Malaysian badminton player and coach